In mathematics, a loop in a topological space  is a continuous function  from the unit interval  to  such that  In other words, it is a path whose initial point is equal to its terminal point.

A loop may also be seen as a continuous map  from the pointed unit circle  into , because  may be regarded as a quotient of  under the identification of 0 with 1.

See also
Free loop
Loop group
Loop space
Loop algebra
Fundamental group
Quasigroup

References

Topology

es:Grupo fundamental#Lazo